James Reyne is the debut studio album by Australian singer-songwriter James Reyne, released in September 1987. It was the singer's first solo venture since the break-up of the band Australian Crawl in 1986.

Six singles were released from the album: "Fall of Rome", "Hammerhead", "Rip it Up", "Heaven on a Stick", "Motor's Too Fast" and "Always The Way".

The album was re-released on vinyl in January 2017 to celebrate its 30th anniversary.

Review
Tomas Mureika of AllMusic said, "Reyne uses his voice as an instrument, leaping wildly across complex melody lines littered with  hooks" adding the album is "one of the most striking albums of the late-eighties".

In a Cash Box review, they said "Australian musician's American debut showcasing accessible and intelligent pop/rock and should garner healthy AOR attention immediately."

Track listing
"Fall of Rome" (Reyne) – 4:57
"Hammerhead" (Reyne / Hussey) – 4:46
"Mr. Sandman" (Reyne / Hussey) – 4:25
"Counting on Me" (Reyne / Sigerson) – 4:29
"Always the Way" (Reyne / Hussey) – 7:23
"Land of Hope and Glory" (Reyne) – 4:18
"Heaven on a Stick" (Reyne / Hussey) – 3:24
"Motor's Too Fast" (Reyne / Hussey) – 4:13 (US & European release and 1988 Australian re-release)
"Rip it Up" (Reyne / Scott / Sigerson) – 5:42
"Burning Wood" (Reyne) – 2:43
"The Traveller" (Reyne / Scott / Sigerson) – 4:18
"Coin in a Plate" (Reyne / Hussey) (1987 Australian release only) – 4:14

Personnel
 James Reyne – vocals, guitar
 Jef Scott – guitars, bass, vocals
 Davey Faragher – bass
 John Watson – drums and percussion

Guests
 Phil Shenale – keyboards
 David Baerwald – guitar
 David Lindley – lap steel and Hawaiian guitars
Paulinho Da Costa – percussion
 Olivia Newton-John – backing vocals on "Hammerhead"
 Bill Payne – piano
 David Ricketts – guitar, keyboards
 Peter Snell – guitar
 Lee Curreri – keyboards
 Bob Thiele – keyboards

Charts

Weekly charts

Year-end charts

See also
 List of Top 25 albums for 1987 in Australia

References

1987 debut albums
James Reyne albums
Capitol Records albums